A Great American Tragedy is a 1972 American TV movie directed by J. Lee Thompson.

Plot
A middle-aged aerospace engineer is fired. He is unable to find a new job, his wife forced to go back to work and his marriage starts to break up.

Cast
George Kennedy as Brad Wilkes
Vera Miles as Gloria Wilkes
William Windom as Rob Stewart
Sallie Shockley as Carol
Hilarie Thompson as Julie WIlkes
James Woods as Rick
Natalie Trundy as Paula Braun
Kevin McCarthy as Mark Reynolds
Norman Burton
Stephen Coit
Regis Cordic
Peter Dane
Jo de Winter
Tony Dow as Johnny
Nancy Hadley as Trudy Stewart
Emmaline Henry
Marcia Mae Jones as Claire
John Lasell
Robert Mandan as Leslie Baker
William Sargent
Bob Harks as Hotel Guest

Reception
The New York Times said "thought and care have gone into" the film but felt "home‐set viewers who have felt the budget pinch aren't likely to bleed for this case of unemployment... Both J. Lee Thompson's direction and Caryl Ledner's writing are best in the rather coolly dispassionate vignettes peeling down the prideful hero, as in one scene at an unemployment office. But Kennedy's moment of truth, a simple decision to buckle down and roll up his sleeves, take a long, exasperating wait that provokes curiosity, hardly sympathy."

The Los Angeles Times said it "ranked among the best workthat director J. Lee Thompson, in his TV movie debut, has ever done."

References

External links
A Great American Tragedy at IMDb
A Great American Tragedy at TCMDB
A Great American Tragedy at BFI
A Great American Tragedy at Letterbox DVD

1972 films
1972 television films
American television films
Films directed by J. Lee Thompson
Unemployment in fiction